Alu Kapa (born 24 October 1959) is a cricket umpire from Papua New Guinea. He is currently a member of ICC Associates and Affiliates Umpire Panel. Kapa has stood in matches in the 2015–17 ICC World Cricket League Championship. In October 2016 he was selected as one of the eight umpires to stand in matches in the 2016 ICC World Cricket League Division Four tournament. He stood in his first One Day International (ODI) match between Papua New Guinea and Scotland on 24 November 2017. He stood in his first Twenty20 International (T20I) match between the Philippines and Vanuatu in the Regional Final of the 2018–19 ICC World Twenty20 East Asia-Pacific Qualifier tournament on 23 March 2019.

See also
 List of One Day International cricket umpires
 List of Twenty20 International cricket umpires

References

External links
 Alu Kapa at ESPNcricinfo
 Alu Kapa at CricketArchive

1959 births
Living people
Papua New Guinean cricket umpires
Papua New Guinean One Day International cricket umpires
Papua New Guinean Twenty20 International cricket umpires